The parasternal line is a vertical line on the front of the thorax. It is midway between the lateral sternal line and the mid-clavicular line.

External links
 http://www.meddean.luc.edu/lumen/MedEd/medicine/pulmonar/apd/ap.htm

Anatomy